Ucluelet Water Aerodrome  is located adjacent to Ucluelet, British Columbia, Canada.

See also
 List of airports on Vancouver Island

References

Seaplane bases in British Columbia
Barkley Sound region
Registered aerodromes in British Columbia